"Say You Do" is the third single by British electronic musician Sigala. It features British singer Imani Williams and British drum and bass musician DJ Fresh. It was released on 18 March 2016 as a digital download in the United Kingdom through Ministry of Sound. It is the follow-up to his previous single "Sweet Lovin'". The track interpolates a hook from Mariah Carey's "Always Be My Baby".

Music video
A music video to accompany the release of "Say You Do" was first released onto YouTube on 5 February 2016 at a total length of three minutes and thirty-one seconds. Imani appears throughout the whole video, while Sigala and DJ Fresh don't. The video was filmed at Port Antonio, Jamaica.

Track listing

Charts and certifications

Charts

Year-end charts

Certifications

Release history

References

2016 singles
2016 songs
DJ Fresh songs
Ministry of Sound singles
Tropical house songs
Sigala songs
Songs written by Sigala
Songs written by Jason Pebworth
Songs written by Jon Shave
Songs written by Mariah Carey
Songs written by Jermaine Dupri
Songs written by Manuel Seal
Song recordings produced by the Invisible Men
Song recordings produced by DJ Fresh
Songs written by DJ Fresh